Yu Minzhong (1714–1779) was an official of the Qing Dynasty, who served as chief grand councilor for part of the reign of the Qianlong Emperor. Yu Minzhong was a native of Jintan, Jiangsu province. In 1737, he became a Zhuangyuan of the Imperial examination. Before his appointment as chief grand councilor, he served as an editor and scribe to the emperor. During his tenure as chief grand councilor, a significant rise in corruption occurred.

References

1714 births
1779 deaths
Grand Councillors of the Qing dynasty
Grand Secretaries of the Qing dynasty
Assistant Grand Secretaries
Qing dynasty politicians from Jiangsu
Politicians from Changzhou